Pietro "Gedeone" Carmignani (born 22 January 1945) is an Italian professional football coach and a former player. He is best known for his playing career as a goalkeeper and, later, for being one of the most trusted assistants of manager Arrigo Sacchi throughout his career.

Honours

As a player
Juventus
 Serie A champion: 1971–72.

Napoli
 Coppa Italia winner: 1975–76.

As a coach
Parma
 Coppa Italia winner: 2001–02.

External links

1945 births
Living people
Italian footballers
Serie A players
Serie B players
Como 1907 players
S.S.D. Varese Calcio players
Juventus F.C. players
S.S.C. Napoli players
ACF Fiorentina players
Association football goalkeepers
Italian football managers
Parma Calcio 1913 managers